Big Kids is a 13-episode children's comedy television series created by Lucy Daniel-Raby. The series was a British-American co-production of the BBC and the US network Noggin and aired on its nighttime block The N.  It premiered on CBBC on BBC One on 27 September 2000 and on the Noggin channel on 29 January 2001. All 13 episodes were aired on Noggin's sister channel, Nickelodeon, from 9 to 30 March 2001.

History 
According to the show's developer, Elaine Sperber, the writers "had to tread carefully" to make sure that the content was relevant to both UK and U.S. children. She said, "We had a great relationship with Noggin ... but when you co-produce with North Americans, you always run into problems over British accents and language. We couldn’t use terms like 'snogging' in Big Kids because no one in the U.S. would have understood it." The magazine Kidscreen wrote that "children start drinking far earlier in Britain than they do in North America, so a sequence showing booze being consumed at a school dance had to be watered down."

On Noggin, the show was aired as part of a primetime programming block called "The Hubbub," which allowed viewers to submit comments through Noggin's website and see them live on-air. Noggin grouped the final two episodes as an hour-long special, and they aired on 25 March 2001. Leading up to them, Noggin reran a marathon of the entire series, promoted as the Big Kids Big Marathon. From April 2002 to January 2004, Noggin aired reruns of Big Kids during its nighttime programming block, The N.

Plot 
The show follows the lives of the Spiller family: Simon, Kate, and their parents, Sarah, a piano teacher, and Geoff, a doctor. When the family attends a school charity event, a hypnotist and entertainer named Ming the Mind Master uses Sarah and Geoff in a performance. After the show is over, Kate and Simon realize that their parents have never been properly unhypnotized. At seemingly random moments, they black out and begin to act like children.

The two siblings have to deal with keeping their parents under control in their hypnotized state, trying to get their parents to believe what happens when they black out, and trying to discover what triggers the change. Simon tries to keep his parents' hypnosis a secret from his best friend, Jake, who lives across the street and often visits at inopportune times. During trances, Sarah and Geoff engage in behaviour for which they would otherwise scold their children, while Kate and Simon are forced to act like mature adults. According to Noggin, the show was meant to explore "the complex and sometimes chaotic relationship between parent and child."

Eventually, the children convince their parents by showing them filmed footage, and discover that the trigger is "ming", or any word with "ming" in it, just like the hypnotist's name. They finally track down Ming at a fête and convince him to 'unhypnotise' their parents, which appears to restore them to normal. However, their childish behaviour on a carousel leaves the children confused – whether Sarah and Geoff are acting like this deliberately, have fallen back into a state of hypnosis, or perhaps have always had the qualities of 'big kids' is left ambiguous.

Episode list 
 Performance by a Hypnotist
 Kate Avoids Friends
 Videotaping Mum and Dad
 Library/Shopping
 Restaurant
 New Car/Concert
 Museum
 Aunt Muriel
 Chicken Pox
 Puppy
 Simon Pursues Melanie
 Trigger Revealed
 Finding Hypnotist

Cast 
 Duncan Duff - Dr. Geoffrey "Geoff" Spiller
 Imogen Stubbs - Sarah Spiller
 Matt Adams - Simon Spiller
 Kelly Salmon - Kate Spiller
 Sam Green - Jake Tyler
 Jasper Britton - Ming the Mind Master
 Amanda Fairbank-Hynes - Becky
 Barnaby Francis - Edward Bagley

Awards and nominations 
At the 23rd Young Artist Awards, held in April 2002 in Studio City, California, both Matt Adams and Kelly Salmon were nominated for their roles. At the ceremony, the series was counted as an American production, and the nominations were received on behalf of Noggin.

References

External links 
 
 

2000 British television series debuts
2000 British television series endings
2000s British comedy television series
2000 American television series debuts
2000 American television series endings
2000s American comedy television series
Noggin (brand) original programming
The N original programming
BBC children's television shows
English-language television shows
Television series about families
Television shows set in London